Beate Richter is a German former figure skater who represented East Germany. She is the 1967 Blue Swords champion, the 1967 Prague Skate silver medalist, and a four-time East German national medalist. She finished in the top ten at the 1967 European Championships in Ljubljana, Yugoslavia. Her skating club was TSC Berlin.

Competitive highlights

References 

German female single skaters
Figure skaters from Berlin
Living people
Year of birth missing (living people)
20th-century German women